Roberta is a 1935 American musical film by RKO starring Irene Dunne, Fred Astaire, Ginger Rogers, and Randolph Scott. It was an adaptation of the 1933 Broadway musical Roberta, which in turn was based on the novel Gowns by Roberta by Alice Duer Miller.  It was a solid hit, showing a net profit of more than three-quarters of a million dollars.

The film kept the famous songs "Yesterdays", "Let's Begin" (with altered lyrics), and "Smoke Gets in Your Eyes" from the play, along with a fourth song, "I'll Be Hard to Handle". Three songs from the play were dropped—"The Touch of Your Hand", "Something Had to Happen" and "You're Devastating". Two songs were added to this film, "I Won't Dance" (resurrected from the flop Kern show Three Sisters) and "Lovely to Look At", which both became #1 hits in 1935. The latter addition was nominated for the Best Song Oscar. The songs "I Won't Dance" and "Lovely to Look At" have remained so popular that they are now almost always included in revivals and recordings of Roberta.

This was the first of three pairings for Irene Dunne and Randolph Scott; High, Wide and Handsome (1937) and My Favorite Wife (1940) were the other two.

Roberta is the third Astaire-Rogers film, and the only one to be remade with other actors. MGM did so in 1952, entitling the new Technicolor version Lovely to Look At. Indeed, with an eye to a remake, MGM bought Roberta in 1945, keeping it out of general circulation until the 1970s.

Plot
John Kent, a former star football player at Harvard, goes to Paris with his friend Huck Haines and Huck's dance band, the Wabash Indianians. Alexander Voyda has booked the band, but refuses to let them play when he finds the musicians are not the Indians he expected, but merely from Indiana.

John turns to the only person he knows in Paris for help, his Aunt Minnie, who owns the fashionable "Roberta" gown shop. While there, he meets her chief assistant (and secretly the head designer), Stephanie. John is quickly smitten with her.

Meanwhile, Huck unexpectedly stumbles upon someone he knows very well. "Countess Scharwenka", a temperamental customer at Roberta's, turns out to be his hometown sweetheart Lizzie Gatz. She gets Huck's band an engagement at the nightclub where she is a featured entertainer, and Huck agrees to keep her true identity a secret.

Two things trouble John: One is Ladislaw, a handsome, deposed Russian prince and doorman, who seems too interested in Stephanie. The other is the memory of Sophie, the snobbish, conceited girlfriend he left behind after they quarreled about his lack of sophistication and polish.

When Aunt Minnie dies unexpectedly without leaving a will, John inherits the shop. Knowing nothing about women's fashion and aware that his aunt intended for Stephanie to inherit the business, he persuades Stephanie to remain on as his partner. Correspondents flock to hear what a football player has to say about feminine fashions. Huck gives the answers, making a lot of weird statements about the innovations John is planning to introduce.

Sophie arrives in Paris, attracted by John's good fortune. She enters the shop, looking for a dress, but is dissatisfied with everything Stephanie shows her. Huck persuades her to choose a gown that John had ordered to be discarded as too vulgar. When John sees her in it, they quarrel for the final time.

John reproaches Stephanie for selling Sophie the gown. Terribly hurt, Stephanie quits the shop. With Roberta putting on a fashion show in a week, Huck takes over the design work, with predictably bad results. When Stephanie sees his awful creations, she is persuaded to return to save Roberta's reputation.

The show is a triumph, helped by the entertainment provided by Huck, Countess Scharwenka, and the band. The climax is a gown modeled by Stephanie herself. At the show, John overhears that she and Ladislaw are leaving Paris and mistakenly assumes that they have married. Later, he congratulates her for becoming a princess. When she informs him that Ladislaw is merely her cousin and that the title has been hers since birth, the lovers are reunited. Huck and Lizzie, who decide to get married, do a final tap dance sequel.

Cast

Musical numbers
 "The Pipe Organ Number": Astaire performing on the hands of his band arranged as a keyboard
 "Let's Begin": Comedy song and dance number by Astaire, Candy Candido and Gene Sheldon, with band
 "Yesterdays": Sung by Dunne, with guitar and string bass accompaniment
 "I'll Be Hard to Handle": Double dance by Astaire and Rogers, a tap number in which they "talk with their feet" (repartee expressed in dance steps).
 "I Won't Dance": Song by Rogers and Astaire, Astaire introduces at piano; followed by a solo dance to the melody by Astaire
 "Smoke Gets in Your Eyes": Sung by Dunne (reprise danced by Rogers and Astaire)
 "Russian Lullaby": Sung by Dunne with balalaika orchestra
 "Fashion Pageant": Parade of models in an array of costumes to a medley of songs, with Astaire as master of ceremonies
 "Lovely to Look At": Dunne solo and Rogers and Astaire dance
 "Finale Dance": Astaire and Rogers

Reception
According to RKO records, the film made $1,467,000 in the US and Canada and $868,000 elsewhere, resulting in a profit of $770,000.

In popular culture
The Venetian fashion house Roberta di Camerino, founded by Giuliana Camerino in 1945, was named for the film.

References

 Green, Stanley (1999) Hollywood Musicals Year by Year (2nd ed.), pub. Hal Leonard Corporation  page 40

External links

 
 
 
 
 Review of Roberta (1935) at TV Guide
 Roberta Film Page, Reel Classics - info, photos, sound clips

1935 films
American black-and-white films
Films based on musicals
Films directed by William A. Seiter
Films scored by Max Steiner
RKO Pictures films
1935 musical films
Films set in Paris
Films about fashion
Films based on adaptations
Films with screenplays by Jane Murfin
Films based on works by Alice Duer Miller
American musical films
1930s American films